William L. Hague (1852 – November 21, 1898), born as William L. Haug, was an American Major League Baseball player who played as a third baseman from 1875 to 1879, for three teams: the St. Louis Brown Stockings of the National Association, the Louisville Grays and the Providence Grays, both of the National League.

References

External links

1852 births
1898 deaths
Major League Baseball third basemen
St. Louis Brown Stockings (NA) players
Louisville Grays players
Providence Grays players
19th-century baseball players
Baseball players from Philadelphia